Vyazemsky District is an administrative and municipal district (raion), one of the seventeen in Khabarovsk Krai, Russia. It is located in the southwest of the krai. Its administrative center is the town of Vyazemsky. As of the 2010 Census, the total population of the district was 22,974, with the population of the administrative center accounting for 63.4% of that number.

References

Notes

Sources

Districts of Khabarovsk Krai
States and territories established in 1934